Scoring the End of the World is the sixth studio album by American metalcore band Motionless in White. It was released on June 10, 2022, through Roadrunner Records. The album was produced by Drew Fulk and Justin DeBlieck. It is the band's first album to feature drummer Vinny Mauro and bassist Justin Morrow performing on the release.

Background and promotion
In May 2020, during a livestream interview, Chris Motionless announced that they were already working on their next album, and assured that the songs for the album will be heavier, although the recording could be delayed due to the COVID-19 pandemic.

On March 7, 2022, the band announced that they were planning to release new music on Friday, March 11, with a 30-second video teaser hinting at some potentially new music. On that day, the band officially released the new single "Cyberhex" featuring Lindsay Schoolcraft along with its music video. At the same time, they officially announced the album itself while also revealing the album cover and the track list.

On April 14, the band unveiled the second single "Masterpiece" and its corresponding music video. On May 13, the band released the third single "Slaughterhouse" featuring Bryan Garris of Knocked Loose. On June 3, one week before the album release, the band released the title track "Scoring the End of the World" featuring Mick Gordon.

Composition

Influences, style and themes
Scoring the End of the World has been described as industrial metal, metalcore, and gothic metal, leaning heavily into deathcore at times, as well as hard rock. The final breakdown of "Slaughterhouse" is heavily influenced by beatdown hardcore.

The album additionally contains nu metal influences on certain tracks, such as "Sign of Life", "Cyberhex", and "Scoring the End of the World" all featuring rapping vocals. "Red, White & Boom" is a hard rock and industrial metalcore song. "Werewolf" is a pop rock song featuring synth-pop and electropop influences. "Burned at Both Ends II", has been described as progressive metalcore, while "B.F.B.T.G.: Corpse Nation" has drawn comparisons to the horror theatrics of Ice Nine Kills. "Masterpiece" and "Porcelain" are noted for their similarities to, and taking influence, from Breaking Benjamin, with "Masterpiece" being described as a power ballad and also drawing comparisons to My Chemical Romance.

Scoring the End of the World is a politically-charged album, with its lyrics touching upon themes such as global warming, corrupt leadership, inequality, and violence. "Sign of Life", "Cause of Death", "Porcelain", and "Werewolf" collectively have a mental health theme, specifically dealing with internal conflict. "Cyberhex" has been stated by lead vocalist Chris Motionless to be a "love letter" to fans of the band.

Critical reception

The album received generally positive reviews from critics. Taylor Markarian from Blabbermouth.net gave the album 7 out of 10 and said: "The big takeaway is that despite how incredible this band can be, they still have not managed to completely weave all of their musical influences together in a way that is unquestionably cohesive." Distorted Sound scored the album 9 out of 10 and said: "With Scoring the End of the World however, MOTIONLESS IN WHITE have earned that accolade. They've stumbled across their golden key and opened the door to a new age for themselves. Disguise may have been the launch pad, but this record shoots MOTIONLESS IN WHITE into their own stratosphere." Kerrang! gave the album 3 out of 5 and stated: "The difference lies not in delivery but in writing, something that MIW have now proved they can get stunningly right – they just need to spend a little longer with that muse."

Rock 'N' Load praised the album saying, "Motionless In White have crafted truly the best release of their career so far with Scoring the End of the World. The album sounds and feels completely fresh while being so familiar at the same time. The songwriting, the musicianship, the range of features, and just everything about this release are at the top of the game. An incredible album that shows a band at truly top form." Simon Crampton of Rock Sins rated the album 9 out of 10 and said: "With each new album, they take a step further to greatness. On Scoring the End of the World, they have created their most complete record. Cleverly, the band takes all the best parts of what makes the band they are and has built an album and sound that will not only reward their long term fans, but will also bring them legions of new ones. This is Motionless In White's defining moment that will take then from infamous underdogs to undeniable superstars." Wall of Sound gave the album a score 7.5/10 and saying: "While it's not a perfect album, it's a continuation of the band's signature sound and an example of what they can produce under extreme amounts of pressure… such as a global pandemic!"

Track listing

Personnel
Credits retrieved from AllMusic.

Motionless in White
 Chris "Motionless" Cerulli – lead vocals, composition
 Ryan Sitkowski – lead guitar
 Ricky "Horror" Olson – rhythm guitar, co-lead vocals
 Justin Morrow – bass, backing vocals, composition
 Vinny Mauro – drums

Additional musicians
 Bryan Garris of Knocked Loose – guest vocals (5)
 Lindsay Schoolcraft – guest vocals (10, 11)
 Caleb Shomo of Beartooth – guest vocals (12)
 Mick Gordon – guest instrumentation, vocals (13)
 Tom Hane – additional instrumentation (8, 12), additional vocals (8), composition
 Alyce Madden – additional vocals (tracks 1, 11)
 Steve Sopchak – additional vocals (3), composition
 Jonathan McLean – additional vocals (9)
 Ellie Mitchell – additional vocals (11, 13)

Additional personnel
 Drew Fulk – production, composition, additional vocals (2)
 Justin DeBlieck – production, composition, additional vocals, guitar solo (8)
 Zakk Cervini – mixing
 Ted Jensen – mastering
 Johnny Andrews, Jordan Raymond Curran, Mick Kenney, Bobby Lynge, Micah Rayan Premnath, Erik Ron and John Sustar – composition

Charts

Year-end charts

References

2022 albums
Motionless in White albums
Roadrunner Records albums